Kentucky Route 241 (KY 241) is a  state highway in the U.S. state of Kentucky. It is located in Shelby and Henry counties.

Route description

The route originates at a junction with KY 43 in Cropper and travels north for  before entering into Henry County and the city of Pleasureville. It continues north through Pleasureville and ends at its northern terminus at U.S. Route 421 a little over  into Henry County.

Major intersections

References

External links
 
 

0241
Transportation in Shelby County, Kentucky
Transportation in Henry County, Kentucky